The Edgemont School District or Edgemont Union Free School District is a school district in Westchester County, New York. Its superintendent is Victoria Kniewel.

Schools

Seely Place Elementary School

Seely Place Elementary School is an elementary school in Edgemont Union Free School District located in The Town of Greenburgh (Scarsdale Zip Code), Westchester County, New York, serving students in grades K-6.

Greenville Elementary School

Greenville Elementary School is an elementary school located in The Town of Greenburgh (Scarsdale Zip Code), Westchester County, New York, serving students in grades K-6.

Edgemont Jr/Sr High School

Edgemont Junior - Senior High School is a high school in The Town of Greenburgh (Scarsdale Zip Code), Westchester County, New York, serving students in grades 7 -12.  Its feeder schools are Greenville School and Seely Place School, where students graduate in the sixth grade.

Ranking in the Mass Media
The Edgemont School District has consistently received high rankings in both New York State and Nationally. Edgemont School District was selected by Niche Magazine as the #1 Public School District in America in 2015.

References

External links
Edgemont Union Free School District
Great Schools Website

School districts in New York (state)
Education in Westchester County, New York